Jordan Keegan is an Irish footballer who plays as a forward for League of Ireland side Shelbourne.

Playing career
Keegan played with League of Ireland side St Patrick's Athletic. He then moved on to Monaghan United, until the club folded in June 2012.

He signed with English League One side Scunthorpe United in August 2012. He made his debut on 21 August, in a 2–1 defeat to Crewe Alexandra at Glanford Park; he was an 87th-minute substitute for Josh Walker.

Statistics

References

External links

Living people
1992 births
Republic of Ireland association footballers
Republic of Ireland expatriate association footballers
Expatriate footballers in England
Association football forwards
St Patrick's Athletic F.C. players
Monaghan United F.C. players
Scunthorpe United F.C. players
Dundalk F.C. players
Shelbourne F.C. players
League of Ireland players
English Football League players
A Championship players